The Cimarons are a British reggae band formed in 1967. They were the UK's first self-contained indigenous reggae band.

History
Jamaican natives, the Cimarons migrated to Britain in 1967 with a lineup consisting of Franklyn Dunn (bass), Carl Levy (keyboards), Locksley Gichie (guitar), and Maurice Ellis (drums); vocalist, Winston Reid (better known as Winston Reedy) joined in London. They were primarily session musicians in Jamaica, and backed many artists, including Jimmy Cliff. They performed at the Edinburgh Reggae Festival in 1973, where they also backed Nicky Thomas's performance of "Is It Because I'm Black".

Their first LP In Time, on Trojan Records in 1974 featured a rendition of the O'Jays' "Ship Ahoy", "Utopian Feeling", "Over the Rainbow," and "My Blue Heaven". Vulcan Records released On the Rock two years later.

They switched to Polydor Records, releasing Live at the Roundhouse in 1978. Polydor released Maka the same year. During this period they did a major British tour supporting Sham 69.Three more albums followed: Freedom Street, Reggaebility and On the Rock Part 2. After the last of these, in 1983, they didn't surface again until 1995 when Lagoon Records released People Say and Reggae Time, both compilations of earlier albums, followed by The Best of the Cimarons, released in 1999 on Culture Press.

Reedy and Dunn continue to perform as The Cimarons.

Discography

Albums
In Time (1974) Trojan
On the Rock (1976) Vulcan
Maka (1978) Polydor
Live (1978) Polydor
Freedom Street (1980) Virgin
Reggaebility (1982) Hallmark
On De Rock Part 2 (1983) Butt (recorded 1976)

Compilations
People Say (1991) Lagoon (recorded 1974-76)
Reggae Time Lagoon 
The Best of the Cimarons (1992) Culture Press 
Maroon Land (2001) Rhino 
Reggae Best (2004) Culture Press 
Reggae Masters (2007) Creon

Singles
"Funky Fight" (1970) Big Shot
"Oh Mammy Blue" (1971) Downtown
"Holy Christmas" (1971) Downtown
"Struggling Man" (1972) Horse (split 7-inch with The Prophets)
"Snoopy vs. the Red Baron" (1973) Mooncrest (as Hotshots) UK #4
"Talking Blues" (#1 in Jamaica)
"Check Out Yourself" Trojan
"You Can Get It If You Really Want" (1974) Trojan
"Dim the Light" (1976) Trojan
"Over the Rainbow" Trojan
"Harder Than the Rock" (1978) Polydor
"Mother Earth" (1978) Polydor
"Willin' (Rock Against Racism)"/"Truly" (1978) Polydor
"Ready for Love" (1981) Charisma
"With a Little Luck" (1982) IMP
"Big Girls Don't Cry" (1982) Safari
"How Can I Prove Myself to You" (1982)
"Be My Guest Tonight" (1995)
"Time Passage" Fontana

The Cimarons also backed several singers on Trojan singles, often credited on the B-side with an instrumental version of the A-side.

References

Musical groups from London
British reggae musical groups
Trojan Records artists